Sulfur bromide may refer to:

 Sulfur dibromide
 Disulfur dibromide